Jean Cruppi (22 May 1855 in Toulouse – 16 October 1933 in Fontainebleau) was a French politician of the Third Republic. He was married to author and activist Louise Cruppi.

1855 births
1933 deaths
Politicians from Toulouse
Radical Party (France) politicians
French Ministers of Commerce and Industry
Government ministers of France
Members of the 7th Chamber of Deputies of the French Third Republic
Members of the 8th Chamber of Deputies of the French Third Republic
Members of the 9th Chamber of Deputies of the French Third Republic
Members of the 10th Chamber of Deputies of the French Third Republic
Members of the 11th Chamber of Deputies of the French Third Republic
French Senators of the Third Republic
Senators of Haute-Garonne